Bulan or  Bolan or Boolan or Bowlan may refer to:

Bulan, Kermanshah
Bulan, Tehran